Malik St. Prix (born 17 July 1995) is a Saint Lucian footballer currently playing for Cosmos Nowotaniec in Poland. A St. Lucian international, he has also represented clubs in Honduras and Trinidad and Tobago.

Early life
St. Prix grew up in Gros Islet where he played football during his schoolyears. His flamboyant style of play led to him earning the nickname "Showtyme". He initially aspired to become a veterinarian but switched his focus to football when he realised he could make a career in the sport.

Playing career
St. Prix's first professional club was W Connection in the TT Pro League. In 2018, he joined Liga Nacional de Fútbol Profesional de Honduras club C.D.S. Vida, making his debut against C.D. Honduras Progreso. Following his departure from the club, he spent two seasons with Northern United All Stars in the SLFA First Division.

In July 2021, St. Prix signed for PEPO Lappeenranta, a club competing in the Ykkönen, the second tier of Finnish football.

International career

International goals
Scores and results list Saint Lucia's goal tally first.

References

External links
 

1995 births
Living people
Saint Lucian footballers
Saint Lucia international footballers
W Connection F.C. players
C.D.S. Vida players
Northern United All Stars players
TT Pro League players
Saint Lucian expatriate footballers
Expatriate footballers in Trinidad and Tobago
Expatriate footballers in Honduras
Expatriate footballers in Finland
Saint Lucian expatriate sportspeople in Trinidad and Tobago
Saint Lucian expatriate sportspeople in Honduras
Saint Lucian expatriate sportspeople in Finland
Association football midfielders